Parañaque Patriots also known as Parañaque Patriots–yabo Sports are a professional Filipino basketball team in the Maharlika Pilipinas Basketball League. It is owned by Parañaque Vice Mayor Joan Villafuerte.

History
 On January 25, 2018, the Parañaque Patriots won their first Maharlika Pilipinas Basketball League match against the Caloocan Supremos with the score of 70-60.
 On April 3, 2018, the Patriots earn its biggest upset win, 77–70, against the second-seeded Bulacan Kuyas in their do-or-die match in the best-of-three quarterfinals to clinch their ticket to the semifinals.

Team roster

Depth chart

Head coaches

All-time roster

 Harold Arboleda (2018–2019)
 Juneric Baloria (2018)
 Jonathan Belorio (2018)
 Mico Custodio (2018)
 Gabriel Dagangon (2018)
 Daniel de Guzman (2018)
 Edsel Del Rosario (2018–present)
 Howard Flor (2018-present)
 Algin Justiniani (2018–present)
 Ryusei Koga (2018–2019)
 Mac Montilla (2018–2019)
 Rom Mangalino (2019–2020)
 Harold Sta. Cruz (2018–present)
 Jett Vidal (2018)
 Mayce Toribio (2018–present)
 Miguel Castellano (2018–present)

Season-by-season records
Records from the 2019-20 MPBL season:

References

 
2017 establishments in the Philippines
Basketball teams established in 2017
Maharlika Pilipinas Basketball League teams
Sports teams in Metro Manila